Pune Nanded  Express is a Superfast train belonging to South Central Railway zone of Indian Railways  that run between  and  in India.

Background
This train was inaugurated on 2 July 2002 from Hazur Sahib Nanded, flagged off by Nitish Kumar former minister of Railways, and was also included on 2002 rail budget.

Service
This train is  daily and covers the distance of 661 km with an average speed of 55 km/h with a total time of 12 hours.

Routes

Traction
As the route is partially electrified a WDM-3A of Diesel Loco Shed, Pune pulls the train to its destination on both sides.

External links
 12729 Pune–Nanded Express India Rail Info
 12730 Nanded–Pune Express India Rail Info

References

Express trains in India
Transport in Pune
Transport in Nanded
Rail transport in Maharashtra